The Pearl and Eva Chambers House is a historic house located at 1615 State Street in Eau Claire, Wisconsin. It was added to the National Register of Historic Places on January 12, 2012.

History
The house was owned by lumberman Pearl Chambers. After Pearl's death in 1941, his widow, Eva, lived in the house until it was sold in 1953.

References

Houses in Eau Claire, Wisconsin
Houses completed in 1928
Houses on the National Register of Historic Places in Wisconsin
National Register of Historic Places in Eau Claire County, Wisconsin